Neolitsea vidalii is a species of tree in the family Lauraceae. It is endemic to the Philippines. Its populations have declined because of habitat loss through logging and shifting cultivation.

References

vidalii
Vulnerable plants
Trees of the Philippines
Endemic flora of the Philippines
Taxonomy articles created by Polbot